Deniz Tansel Öngel (born 24 September 1976) is a Turkish actor.

Life and career 
Öngel is the child of an immigrant family. After Ottoman Empire collapsed, His paternal grandmother was a Turkish immigrant from Thessaloniki , while his maternal grandmother is of Egyptian descent, and his grandfather is of Lebanese descent . He was born in Kilis, where his parents worked as teachers, and later grew up in Ankara. Öngel graduated from the Hacettepe University Ankara State Conservatory in 2000 with a degree in theatre studies. In the same year, he started working for the Turkish State Theatres in Trabzon and later joined the Istanbul State Theatre. 

He made his television debut in 2004 with the series Uy Başımıza Gelenler, starring alongside Hakan Yılmaz and Başak Köklükaya. He had the leading role in the 2010 series Kılıç Günü, directed by Osman Sınav and Raşit Çelikezer.

Öngel further rose to prominence with his portrayal of Alvise Gritti in Muhteşem Yüzyıl for 36 episodes. Between 2012 and 2014, he was among the leading cast of Benim İçin Üzülme, starring alongside Fulya Zenginer, Barış Arduç, Çağlar Ertuğrul, Selin Şekerci and Öykü Çelik. He later appeared as Mert in the series Yaz'ın Öyküsü, before starring with Nesrin Cavadzade in the movie Son Mektup, which was released in 2015.

Theatre 
 A Streetcar Named Desire : Tennessee Williams - Oyun Atölyesi - 2017
 Coriolanus : William Shakespeare - Istanbul State Theatre - 2016
 The Great Gatsby : Scott Fitzgerald - Istanbul State Theatre - 2015
 Incendies : Wajdi Mouawad - Istanbul State Theatre - 2011
 Doğal Zehir : Eric Chappel - Trabzon State Theatre - 2009
 The Dumb Waiter : Harold Pinter - Trabzon State Theatre - 2007
 Benerci Kendini Niçin Öldürdü : Nâzım Hikmet - Istanbul State Theatre - 2005
 All My Sons : Arthur Miller - Trabzon State Theatre - 2004
 Little Shop of Horrors : Howard Ashman - Trabzon State Theatre - 2003
 Twelfth Night : William Shakespeare - Trabzon State Theatre - 2003
 Whose Life Is It Anyway? : Brian Clark - Trabzon State Theatre - 2002
 A Midsummer Night's Dream : William Shakespeare - Trabzon State Theatre - 2001
 Kurban : Güngör Dilmen - Trabzon State Theatre- 2000
 Zengin Mutfağı : Vasıf Öngören - Trabzon State Theatre - 1999
 Yaşar Ne Yaşar Ne Yaşamaz : Aziz Nesin - Trabzon State Theatre - 1999
 Birimiz Hep İçin : Zühtü Erkan - Trabzon State Theatre - 1999

Filmography

TV series 
 Hayat Bugün (2022–) : Aras Erdem
 Mavera (2021) : Mahmud
 Masumlar Apartmanı (2020–2022) : Naci
 Kırmızı Oda (2020) - Tarık
 Ya İstiklal Ya Ölüm (2020)
 Kalbimin Sultanı (2018) : Namık Paşa
 Kanıt Ateş Üstünde (2016) : Kaan
 Yaz'ın Öyküsü (2015) : Mert
 Benim İçin Üzülme (2012) : Niyazi
 Muhteşem Yüzyıl (2011) : Alvise Gritti
 Geniş Aile (2010) : Cihangir (guest appearance)
 Kılıç Günü (2010) : Kılıç Ali
 Bu Kalp Seni Unutur Mu? (2009) : Yalçın
 Elveda Derken (2007) : Kerim
 Adak (2006) : Zeynel
 Güz Yangını (2005) : Kerem
 Kaybolan Yıllar (2006) : guest appearance
 Kısmet (2005)
 Avrupa Yakası (2005) : Demir
 Uy Başuma Gelenler (2004) : Volkan

TV programs 
 Maske Kimsin Sen? (2022) - presenter

Film 
 Hayalet: 3 Yasam (2020) - Nevzat
 Kader Postası (2019)
 Bizim Köyün Şarkısı (2018) - Mehmet
 Babamın Kanatları (2016) - Resul 
 Son Mektup (2015) - Salih Ekrem
 Mucize (2014) - Cemilo 
 Dekupe (2011) - Serkan  
 Kısmet (2004) - Kadir

References

External links 

1976 births
Turkish male stage actors
Turkish male television actors
Turkish male film actors
Turkish people of Greek descent
Turkish people of Egyptian descent
Turkish people of Lebanese descent
Hacettepe University Ankara State Conservatory alumni
Living people